Balaji Sampath (born 17 January 1973) is an Indian educationist, social activist, the founder and secretary of a non-profit Organization, Association for India's Development, India chapter, an India-based NGO that carries out science teaching and primary school programs for children to aid their educational development.

AidIndia trains teachers in government schools with the goal of improving the quality of teaching, especially for science and mathematics by using innovative techniques and devising educational aids . The mission of AidIndia is to empower socially disadvantaged and often forgotten sections of the society through socio-economic development programs, education, providing micro credit, and imparting training in the areas of health, human rights and utilization of resources for income generation.

Balaji is also the founder and CEO of Ahaguru. A pioneer education start-up in online coaching that engages in providing training courses on different subjects online. Balaji has written many science books for primary and higher-level education to explain very complex concepts in a simple and easy to understand language for students.

Personal life 
Balaji was born in Chennai, India on 17 January 1973 into a family where both of his parents were government workers. Because his parents were often transferred to different locations for their government jobs, as a child Balaji was exposed to a number of schools across India. But one thing remained constant: his problem understanding scientific subjects because of ineffective teaching. Early in life, he devised his own system of analysis and arriving at solutions.

Education 
Balaji appeared for IIT JEE and obtained All India Rank 4 in 1990, considered one of the most difficult competitive exams in India. He completed his B.Tech. degree in Electrical Engineering from Indian Institute of Technology Madras in 1994, and his doctorate in Electronics and communication Engineering from University of Maryland, College Park.

Career 
Balaji started his career as a volunteer for AID United States chapter from 1994 while he was doing his doctorate. After completing his PhD degree, he returned to India to work full-time on social issues in 1997 and founded AID India. He worked with the Centre for Ecology and Rural Development and the Peoples Science Movement on Health and Education Programs. Balaji organized Peoples Health assembly campaign in 2000 at a national level and began campaigning for better public education and access to healthcare, especially in the rural areas.

In 2011, Balaji started Ahaguru.com, an online education portal to enhance science and math learning and problem-solving skills of middle and high school students. Yahoo! News said: "This education startup, www.AhaGuru.com, a pioneer in online coaching, provides training courses completely online. From CBSE to NEET and JEE Advanced, it covers physics, chemistry and math courses from class 7 to 12.Their best seller is the full year course, which is modelled like a classroom with an expert teacher explaining the key concepts and showing how to solve different types of questions.". In 2021, his Ahaguru platform became a very big hit. He known for his futuristic thinking by introducing tech-based learning in 2013 itself.

Awards 
 IIT Madras Distinguished Alumnus Award 2012.
 Times of India Social Impact Award for AID, 2011 from Prime Minister, Dr. Manmohan Singh in 2011.
 Ashoka Fellowship for innovative work on Science Education.
 Lemelson Inventor Certificate for Science Education.
 MIT Indus Technovator's Award 2005 for Village Libraries and Science Education.
 Rotary Distinguished Service Award by the Rotary Club of Madras South.
 Pratham USA Achievement Award 2006 for improving reading skills in Tamil Nadu.
 Association for India's Development JS Fellowship, 1998.
 All India Rank 4 in the IIT JEE, 1990.

See also 
 List of Indian Institute of Technology Madras alumni
 Association for India's Development

References

External links 
 Balaji Sampath at TEDxYouth @Chennai - Talk on "Empowering Rural India"

1973 births
Living people
Educators from Tamil Nadu